Akyıldız is a Turkish surname. Notable people with the surname include:

 Elvan Akyıldız (born 1977, Dutch actress
 Gökçe Akyıldız (born 1992), Turkish actress
 Ian F. Akyildiz (born 1954), German computer scientist
 Muhammet Akyıldız (born 1995), Turkish football player
 Volkan Akyıldız (born 1995), Austrian football player

Turkish-language surnames